Swedish DJ and record producer Avicii (also known under the aliases Tim Berg and Tom Hangs) released two studio albums, one compilation album, one remix album, one mix album, 51 singles, one promotional single and 29 music videos. Following his death in 2018, one posthumous studio album and five posthumous singles were also released.

Albums

Studio albums

Compilation albums

Remix albums

Mix albums

Extended plays

Singles

As lead artist

As featured artist

Promotional singles

Other charted songs

Remixes

Writing and production credits

Music videos

As lead artist

As featured artist

Notes

References

External links
 Official website
 Avicii at AllMusic
 
 

Discography
Discographies of Swedish artists
Electronic music discographies